The 2017 Roll Ball World Cup was the 4th edition of the Roll Ball World Cup, organized by the International Roll Ball Federation (IRBF). The tournament was held for first time in Bangladesh, from 17 February to 23 February 2017. 40 teams competed in the tournament.

Participating teams
Some of the participating teams were:

Africa (7)
  
 
 
 
 
 
 
 
Asia (10)
 (Host)
 
 
 
 
 
 
 
 
 

Europe (8)
 
 
 
 
 
 
 
 
 
South America (2)

Venue

Men's tournament 
In the men's tournament India defeated Iran by 8-7.

Knockout stage

Women's tournament 
In the women's section India defeated Iranian team by the margin of 6-4. In third place Kenya 8 - Senegal.
1- India 2 - Iran 3- Kenya 4- Senegal

See also
Maha Roll Ball League

References 

International sports competitions hosted by Bangladesh
Rollball